In the 2006–07 season, Trabzonspor finished in fourth place in the Süper Lig. The top scorer of the team was Umut Bulut, who scored twenty goals.

This article shows statistics of the club's players and matches during the season.

Sponsor
Avea

Players

Süper Lig

Turkish Cup

See also
2006–07 Süper Lig
2006–07 Turkish Cup

Notes

External links

Turkish football clubs 2006–07 season
Trabzonspor seasons